Hierodula doveri is a species of praying mantis in the family Mantidae. Their habitat is West Bengal, India

Distribution 

This species is found in the Indian states of Karnataka, Kerala, Orissa, Maharashtra, Tamil Nadu, and West Bengal.

References

doveri
Articles created by Qbugbot
Insects described in 1924